RFA King Salvor (A291), initially HMS King Salvor (W191), was the lead ship of a class of 12 salvage vessels of the Royal Fleet Auxiliary. A 13th ship was completed as the submarine rescue vessel  for the Royal Navy.

King Salvor was built by Wm. Simons & Co. Ltd. of Renfrew as Allegiance, launched on 18 May 1942, and commissioned on 17 July 1942.

The ship converted into a submarine rescue bell and target ship, and renamed HMS Kingfisher in April 1954.

Decommissioned in 1960, the ship was sold to the Argentine Navy in December 1960 and renamed Tehuelche in 1961, Guardiamarina Zicari in 1963, and disposed of in 1974.

Notes

Further reading

External links
King Salvor class
King Salvor class at uboat.net

King Salvor-class salvage vessels
Ships built on the River Clyde
1942 ships